Edmund Baldwin (1902-1968) was a footballer who played as a centre forward in the Football League for Tranmere Rovers.

References

Tranmere Rovers F.C. players
1902 births
1968 deaths
English footballers
Footballers from Preston, Lancashire
Association football forwards
English Football League players